The 702d Radar Squadron is an inactive United States Air Force unit. It was last assigned to the 20th Air Division, Aerospace Defense Command, stationed at Savannah Air Force Station, Georgia. It was inactivated on 5 June 1979.

The unit was a General Surveillance Radar squadron providing for the air defense of the United States.

Lineage
 Established as the 702d Aircraft Control and Warning Squadron
 Activated on 1 December 1953
 Redesignated 702d Radar Squadron (SAGE) on 1 February 1962
 Redesignated 702d Radar Squadron on 1 February 1974
 Inactivated on 5 June 1979

Assignments
 35th Air Division, 1 December 1953
 32d Air Division, 15 November 1958
 Montgomery Air Defense Sector, 1 July 1961
 32d Air Division, 1 April 1966
 33d Air Division, 14 November 1969
 20th Air Division, 19 November 1969 – 5 June 1979

Stations
 Dobbins AFB, Georgia, 1 December 1953
 Hunter AFB (redesignated: Savannah Air Force Station, Georgia 1 April 1967) 1 March 1955 – 5 June 1979

References

  Cornett, Lloyd H. and Johnson, Mildred W., A Handbook of Aerospace Defense Organization  1946 - 1980,  Office of History, Aerospace Defense Center, Peterson AFB, CO (1980).
 Winkler, David F. & Webster, Julie L., Searching the Skies, The Legacy of the United States Cold War Defense Radar Program,  US Army Construction Engineering Research Laboratories, Champaign, IL (1997).

External links

Radar squadrons of the United States Air Force
Aerospace Defense Command units